The 2017 Scheldeprijs was the 105th edition of the Scheldeprijs road cycling one day race, held on 5 April 2017 as part of the 2017 UCI Europe Tour, as a 1.HC categorised race. The event was noted for being the last official race of Belgian cyclist Tom Boonen on Belgian soil; as such, the race started in Boonen's home town of Mol instead of its usual start in Antwerp, but finished as customary in Schoten.

German rider Marcel Kittel of  won the event for the fifth time in a bunch sprint, further extending his race record; he finished ahead of Italian Elia Viviani and French sprinter Nacer Bouhanni from the  team.

Teams
Twenty-two teams were invited to take part in the race. These included fourteen UCI WorldTeams and eight UCI Professional Continental teams.

Result

References

2017 UCI Europe Tour
2017